H. Wayne Norman Jr. (November 3, 1955 – March 4, 2018) was an American attorney and politician  who was a member of the Maryland Senate, representing District 35 in Harford and Cecil counties. Norman was appointed to the Maryland House of Delegates in 2008 to fill the vacancy created when Delegate Barry Glassman was appointed to the Maryland State Senate to replace J. Robert Hooper, who resigned because of illness. Glassman subsequently was elected as Harford County Executive, leaving a vacancy in the Senate seat. Norman was elected to that vacant Senate seat in the 2014 General Election.

Education
Norman graduated from the University of Baltimore in 1976 with a bachelor's degree in history.  He returned to the University of Baltimore School of Law and received his J.D. in 1980. He was admitted to the Maryland Bar in 1981.

Career
Prior to being appointed to the Maryland House of Delegates, Norman was a member of the Harford County Liquor Board. He was also a member of the Harford County Republican Central Committee from 1998 until 2007. He was a life member of the Harford County Republican Club. Also, he was a member of the Bel Air/Forest Hill Community Council. He was a member of the Harford Chamber of Commerce, the Western Maryland Railway Historical Society, and the Sons of the American Legion.  In addition he was an honorary Life Member of the Kingsville Volunteer Fire Company. Norman maintained his law office in Bel Air, Maryland. He was a past President of the Harford County Bar Association (2008–2009).

Death
Norman died suddenly on March 4, 2018, at the age of 62.

References and notes

External links
 Maryland Manual

1955 births
2018 deaths
Politicians from Baltimore
People from Bel Air, Maryland
Republican Party Maryland state senators
Republican Party members of the Maryland House of Delegates
Lawyers from Baltimore
University of Baltimore alumni
University of Baltimore School of Law alumni
21st-century American politicians
20th-century American lawyers